The Partition of Bengal in 1947, part of the Partition of India, divided the British Indian Bengal Province along the Radcliffe Line between the Dominion of India and the Dominion of Pakistan. The Hindu-majority West Bengal became a state of India, and the Muslim-majority East Bengal (now Bangladesh) became a province of Pakistan.

On 20 June 1947, the Bengal Legislative Assembly met to decide the future of the Bengal Province, as between being a United Bengal within India or Pakistan or divided into East Bengal and West Bengal. At the preliminary joint session, the assembly decided by 120-90 that it should remain united if it joined the new Constituent Assembly of Pakistan. Later, a separate meeting of legislators from West Bengal decided by 58-21 that the province should be partitioned and that West Bengal should join the existing Constituent Assembly of India. In another separate meeting of legislators from East Bengal, it was decided by 106-35 that the province should not be partitioned and by 107-34 that East Bengal should join Pakistan in the event of Partition.

On 6 July 1947, the Sylhet referendum decided to sever Sylhet from Assam and merge it into East Bengal.

The partition, with power transferred to Pakistan and India on 14–15 August 1947, was done according to what has come to be known as the 3 June Plan, or the Mountbatten Plan. Indian independence, on 15 August 1947, ended over 150 years of British rule and influence in the Indian subcontinent. East Pakistan became the independent country of Bangladesh after the 1971 Bangladesh Liberation War.

Background 

In 1905, the First Partition in Bengal was implemented as an administrative preference since governing two provinces, West and East Bengal, would be easier. The partition divides the province between West Bengal, whose majority was Hindu, and East Bengal, whose majority was Muslim, but left considerable minorities of Hindus in East Bengal and Muslims in West Bengal. While the Muslims were in favour of the partition, as they would have their own province, Hindus opposed it. The controversy led to increased violence and protest, and in 1911, the provinces were again united.

However, the disagreements between Hindus and Muslims in Bengal that had sparked the Partition of Bengal in 1905 remained, and laws, including the Second Partition of Bengal in 1947, were implemented to fulfil the political needs of the parties involved.

According to plan, on 20 June 1947, the members of the Bengal Legislative Assembly cast three separate votes on the proposal to partition Bengal:
 In the joint session of the house, composed of all the members of the Assembly, the division of the joint session of the House stood at 126 votes against and 90 votes for joining the existing Constituent Assembly (India)
 The members of the Muslim-majority areas of Bengal in a separate session then passed a motion by 106–35 against partitioning Bengal and instead joining a new Constituent Assembly (Pakistan) as a whole.
 A separate meeting of the members of the non-Muslim-majority areas of Bengal then decided 58–21 to partition the province.

Under the Mountbatten Plan, a single majority vote in favour of partition by either of the notionally-divided halves of the Assembly would have decided the division of the province and hence the proceedings on 20 June resulted in the decision to partition Bengal. That set the stage for the creation of West Bengal as a province of India and East Bengal as a province of the Dominion of Pakistan.

Also in accordance with the Mountbatten Plan, a referendum held on 6 July saw the electorate of Sylhet vote to join East Bengal. Further, the Boundary Commission, headed by Sir Cyril Radcliffe, decided on the territorial demarcation between the two newly created provinces. Power was transferred to Pakistan and India on 14 and 15 August, respectively, under the Indian Independence Act 1947.

Opposition to partition of India 

In Bengal, the Krishak Praja Party's Syed Habib-ul-Rahman said that partitioning India was "absurd" and "chimerical". Criticising the partition of the province of Bengal and India as a whole, Syed Habib-ul-Rahman said that "the Indian, both Hindus and Muslims, live in a common motherland, use the offshoots of a common language and literature, and are proud of the noble heritage of a common Hindu and Muslim culture, developed through centuries of residence in a common land".

United Bengal plan 

After it became apparent that the division of India on the basis of the two-nation theory would almost certainly result in the partition of Bengal along religious lines, the Bengal provincial Muslim League leader Huseyn Shaheed Suhrawardy came up with a new plan to create an independent Bengal state, which would join neither Pakistan nor India and remain unpartitioned. Suhrawardy realised that if Bengal was partitioned, it would be economically disastrous for East Bengal as all coal mines, all but two jute mills and other industrial plants would certainly go to the western part since they were in overwhelmingly-Hindu areas. Most importantly, Calcutta, the largest city in India and an industrial and commercial hub and the largest port, would also go to the western part. Suhrawardy floated his idea on 24 April 1947 at a press conference in Delhi.

However, the plan ran directly counter to that of the Muslim League, which demanded the creation of a separate Muslim homeland on the basis of the two-nation theory. The Bengal provincial Muslim League leadership opinion was divided. The leader Abul Hashim supported it, but Nurul Amin and Mohammad Akram Khan opposed it. However, Muhammad Ali Jinnah realised the validity of Suhrawardy's argument and gave his tacit support to the plan. After Jinnah's approval, Suhrawardy started gathering support for his plan.

For the Congress, only a handful of leaders agreed to the plan, such as the influential Bengal provincial Congress leader Sarat Chandra Bose, the elder brother of Netaji and Kiran Shankar Roy. However, most other leaders and Congress leaders, including Jawaharlal Nehru and Vallabhbhai Patel, rejected the plan. The nationalist Hindu Mahasabha, under the leadership of Shyama Prasad Mukherjee, vehemently opposed it and considered it nothing but a ploy by Suhrawardy to stop the partition of the state so that its industrial west, including the city of Kolkata, would remain under League control. It also claimed that even if the plan was for a sovereign Bengal state, it would be a virtual Pakistan, and the Hindu minority would always be at the mercy of the Muslim majority.

Although the chance of the proposal seeing light without the Congress central committee's approval was slim, Bose and Suhrawardy continued talks to reach an agreement on the political structure of the proposed state. Like Suhrawardy, Bose also felt that Partition would severely hamper Bengal's economy, and almost half of the Hindus would be left stranded in East Pakistan. The agreement was published on 24 May 1947 but was largely political. The proposal had little support at grassroots level, particularly among Hindus. The Muslim League's continuous propaganda for the two-nation theory during the past six years, as well as the marginalisation of Hindus in the Suhrawardy ministry and the vicious 1946 riots, which many Hindus believed to have been sponsored by the state, left little room for trust by the Bengali Hindus. Soon, Bose and Suhrawardy were divided on the nature of the electorate: separate or joint. Suhrawardy insisted upon maintaining the separate electorates for Muslims and non-Muslims. Bose opposed the idea and withdrew. The lack of any other significant support by the Congress caused the United Bengal plan to be discarded. Still, the relatively-unknown episode marked the last attempt among Bengali Muslim and Hindu leadership to avoid Partition and to live together.

Displacement

1946–1951
Following the partition of Bengal between the Hindu-majority West Bengal and the Muslim-majority East Bengal, there was an influx of Hindu/Muslim refugees from both sides. An estimation suggests that before Partition, West Bengal had a population of 21.2 million, of whom only 5.3 million or roughly 25 percent were Muslim minorities, whereas East Bengal had 39.1 million people, of whom a staggering 11.4 million or roughly 30 percent were predominantly Hindu minorities. Nearly 2.16 million Bengali Hindus have left Pakistan's East Bengal for India's West Bengal region, and only four-hundred thousand Bengali Muslims have left India's West Bengal for Pakistan's East Bengal region immediately after Partition because of violence and rioting resulting from mobs supporting West Bengal and East Bengal. Unlike Punjab, India, where a full population exchange between Punjabi Muslims and Punjabi Hindus/Sikhs during partition happened, the same complete population exchange did not happen in Bengal (their population transfer between Bengali Hindus and Bengali Muslims was gradually slower due to occurrence of less violence); overall it was one-sided. During Partition, Hindu Mahasabha leaders like Nirmal Chandra Chatterjee, Shyama Prasad Mukherjee have demanded full exchange of population: that is, an exchange of the Muslim population of West Bengal with that of Hindus of East Bengal, but It didn't happened due to lack of interest of Central Government leaders of that time. Presently, only 8 percent of East Bengal, now Bangladesh, is Hindu, whereas West Bengal is still 27 percent Muslim, compared to 25 percent at the time of Partition.

1960
An estimated one million Hindu refugees had entered West Bengal by 1960, and close to 700,000 Muslims left for East Pakistan. The refugee influx in Bengal was also accompanied by the fact that the government was less prepared to rehabilitate them, which resulted in huge housing and sanitation problems for the millions, most of whom were owners of large property back in East Bengal.

1964
During East Pakistan riot of 1964, it is estimated according to Indian authorities, 135,000 Hindu refugees arrived in West Bengal from East Pakistan, and the Muslims started to migrate to East Pakistan from West Bengal. According to Pakistani figures, by early April, 83,000 Muslim refugees had arrived from West Bengal.

1971
In 1971, during the Bangladesh Liberation War against Pakistan, a large group of refugees numbering an estimated 7,235,916 arrived from Bangladesh to India's West Bengal. Nearly 95% of them were Bengali Hindus and, after Independence of Bangladesh, nearly 1,521,912 people belonging to Bengali Hindu refugees decided to stay back in West Bengal. The Bangladeshi Hindus were mainly settled in Nadia, North 24 parganas and South 24 parganas district of West Bengal after 1971.

Aftermath 
Before the official Radcliffe Line was drawn in 1947, these were the religious demographics in Bengal:
Muslim-majority districts: Dinajpur, Rangpur, Malda, Murshidabad, Rajshahi, Bogra, Pabna, Mymensingh, Jessore, Nadia, Faridpur, Dhaka, Tippera, Bakerganj, Noakhali and Chittagong.
Hindu-majority districts: Calcutta, Howrah, Hooghly, Birbhum, Burdwan, Bankura, Midnapore, Jalpaiguri, Darjeeling, 24 Pargan and Khulna
Buddhist-majority district: Chittagong Hill Tract

Final division:
Pakistan: East Dinajpur, Rangpur, Rajshahi, Bogra, Pabna, Mymensingh, Sylhet (except Karimganj), Khulna, Bakerganj, Tippera (plain Tripura), Noakhali, Chittagong, Jessore , East Nadia, Chittagong Hill Tracts.
India: West Dinajpur, Jalpaiguri, Darjeeling, Malda, Murshidabad, West Nadia, Calcutta, 24 Pargana, Burdwan, Birbhum, Midnapore, Howrah, Hooghly and Karimganj district in Assam.
The second partition of Bengal left behind a legacy of violence that has continues ever since. As Bashabi Fraser put it, "There is the reality of the continuous flow of 'economic migrants', 'refugees', 'infiltrators', 'illegal immigrants' who cross over the border and pan out across the sub-continent, looking for work and a new home, setting in metropolitan centres as far off as Delhi and Mumbai, keeping the question of the Partition alive today".

Displacement crisis 

A massive population transfer began immediately after partition. Millions of Hindus migrated to India from East Bengal, and most of them settled in West Bengal. A significant number even went to Assam, Tripura and other states. However, the refugee crisis was markedly different from Punjab at India's western border. Punjab had witnessed widespread communal riots immediately before partition. As a result, the population transfer in Punjab happened almost immediately after Partition, as terrified people left their homes from both sides. Within a year, the population exchange had been largely complete between East and West Punjab, but in Bengal, violence was limited to Kolkata and Noakhali. Hence in Bengal, the migration occurred much more gradually and continued over the three decades after partition. Although riots were limited in pre-independence Bengal, the environment was communally charged. Both Hindus in East Bengal and Muslims in West Bengal felt unsafe and had to take a crucial decision on whether to leave for an uncertain future in another country or to stay in subjugation under the other community. Among Hindus in East Bengal, those who were better placed economically left first. Government employees were given a chance to swap their posts between India and Pakistan. The educated urban upper and middle classes, the rural gentry, traders, businessmen and artisans left for India soon after partition. They often had relatives and other connections in West Bengal and settled with less difficulty. Muslims followed a similar pattern. The urban and educated upper and middle classes left for East Bengal first.

However, poorer Hindus in East Bengal, most of whom are Dalits found it much more difficult to migrate. Their only property was immovable land holdings. Many sharecropped had no skills other than farming. As a result, most of them decided to stay in East Bengal. However, the political climate in Pakistan deteriorated soon after partition and communal violence started to rise. In 1950, severe riots occurred in Barisal and other places in East Pakistan, causing a further exodus of Hindus. The situation was vividly described by Jogendra Nath Mandal's resignation letter to Pakistani Prime Minister Liaquat Ali Khan. Mandal was a dalit leader and despite being a depressed classes, he supported the Muslim League as a protest to the subjugation of lower-castes by their higher-caste coreligionists. He fled to India and resigned from his cabinet minister's post. For the next two decades, Hindus left East Bengal whenever communal tensions flared up or relationship between India and Pakistan deteriorated as in 1964. The situation of the Hindu minority in East Bengal reached its worst in the months preceding and during the Bangladesh Liberation War of 1971, when the Pakistani Army systematically targeted ethnic Bengalis, regardless of religious background, as part of Operation Searchlight.

In independent Bangladesh, state-sponsored discrimination of Hindus largely stopped. However, like India, the two communities' relationship remains tense and occasional communal violence occurred, such as in the aftermath of Babri Mosque demolition. Illegal immigration to India has continued but is now mostly economic and is not limited to Hindus alone.

Though Muslims in post-independence West Bengal faced some discrimination, it was unlike the state-sponsored discrimination faced by the Hindus in East Bengal. Most Hindus fled from East Bengal, but Muslims largely stayed on in West Bengal. Over the years, however, the community became ghettoised and was socially and economically segregated from the majority community. West Bengali Muslims are highly marginalised, as can be seen from social indicators like literacy and per capita income.

Apart from West Bengal, thousands of Bihari Muslims also settled in East Bengal. They had suffered terribly in severe riots before partition. However, they supported West Pakistan during the Liberation War and were subsequently denied citizenship in independent Bangladesh. Most of the Bihari refugees have remained stateless.

Statistics 
The 1951 census in India recorded 2.523 million refugees from East Bengal, 2.061 million of whom settled in West Bengal. The rest went to Assam, Tripura and other states. By 1973 their number reached over 6 million. The following table shows the major waves of refugee influx and the incident that caused it.

The 1951 census in Pakistan recorded 671,000 refugees in East Bengal, the majority of which came from West Bengal. The rest were from Bihar. By 1961 the numbers reached 850,000. Crude estimates suggest that about 1.5 million Muslims migrated from West Bengal and Bihar to East Bengal in two decades after partition.

Government response 
In Punjab, the Indian government anticipated a population transfer and was ready to take proactive measures. Land plots that were evacuated by Muslims were allotted to incoming Hindu and Sikh refugees. The government allocated substantial resources for the rehabilitation of refugees in Punjab. In contrast, there was no such planning in the eastern part of the country. Neither the central nor the West Bengal state governments anticipated any large-scale population exchange, and no co-ordinated policy was in place to rehabilitate millions of homeless people. The newly independent country had few resources, and the central government was exhausted in resettling 7 million refugees in Punjab. Instead of providing rehabilitation, the Indian government tried to stop and even to reverse the refugee influx from East Bengal. India and Pakistan signed the Liaquat–Nehru Pact in 1950 to stop any further population exchange between West and East Bengal. Both countries agreed to take the refugees back and to return them their property which they evacuated in their respective countries. However, in practice, both countries failed to uphold it. Even after it became clear that refugees were determined not to be sent back, the governments of both countries failed to provide any significant assistance. The government policy of East Bengal refugee rehabilitation mostly consisted of sending them to empty areas, mostly outside of West Bengal. One of the most controversial scheme was the government's decision to settle the refugees by force in Dandakaranya, a barren plot of land in Central India.

Social impact 
Without the government's assistance, the refugees often settled themselves. Some found jobs in factories. Many took small businesses and hawking. Numerous refugee colonies sprang up in Nadia, 24 Paraganas and Kolkata's suburbs. It has been argued recently that the refugees facilitated an incremental urbanization without accumulation, in the frontiers of Calcutta. The process has been termed as 'urbanization with de-accumulation'.

Tripura's tribal insurgency 

The princely state of Tripura had a predominantly-tribal population, but educated Bengalis were welcomed by the King and were prominent in the state's administration in pre-independence India. However, after partition, thousands of Bengali Hindus migrated to Tripura, which changed the state's demography completely. Tripura's tribes became a minority in their own homeland and lost their land holdings. As a result, a tribal insurgency began caused violent riots among tribes and Bengalis in 1980. A low-scale insurgency has continued ever since.

Many Bengalis migrated from East Bengal side during Partition and the Liberation War, but half of the Bengali community of Tripura has lived in Tripura for hundreds of years, according to the 1901 census report, which clearly stated that Bengali and Tripura had numbers that were almost equal.

Economic impact

West Bengal 
Radcliffe's line split Bengal, which had always historically been always a single economic, cultural and ethnic (Bengali-Hindu or Bengali-Muslim) zone, into two halves. Both halves were intricately connected. The fertile East produced food and raw materials which the West consumed and the industrialised West produced manufactured goods which were consumed by the East. According to the POV, this was either considered an exploitative or a mutually-beneficial trade and exchange. This was naturally, severely disrupted by Partition. Rail, road and water communication routes were severed between them.

After Partition, West Bengal suffered from a substantial food shortage as the fertile rice-producing districts went to East Bengal. The shortage continued into the 1950s and the 1960s. By 1959, West Bengal faced an annual food shortage of 950,000 tones. Hunger marches became a common sight in Kolkata.

Jute was the largest industry in Bengal at Partition. The Radcliffe Line left every single jute mill in West Bengal but four fifths of the jute-producing land in East Bengal. The best quality fibre yielding breeds of jute were cultivated mostly in East Bengal. India and Pakistan initially agreed to a trade agreement to import raw jute from East Bengal for West Bengal's mills. However, Pakistan had plans to set up its own mills and put restrictions on raw jute export to India. West Bengal's mills faced acute shortage, and the industry faced a crisis. On the other hand, jute farmers in East Bengal were now without a market to sell their produce. Exporting jute to West Bengal suddenly became an anti-national act for Pakistan. Smuggling of raw jute shot up across the border, but West Bengal rapidly increased jute production and in the mid-to-late 1950s became largely self-sufficient in jute. West Bengal's mills became less dependent on East Bengal for raw materials. Pakistan also set up new factories to process its local produce instead of exporting to India. The following table shows jute production details in both countries in 1961:

West Bengal's paper and leather industry faced similar problems. The paper mills used East Bengal's bamboo, and the tanneries consumed leather, which were also mainly produced in East Bengal. Like jute, the lack of raw material pushed both industries into decline.

Despite central and state governments' best efforts, the pressure of millions of refugees, food shortages and industrial decline after independence put West Bengal in a severe crisis. Dr. B. C. Roy's government tried to cope up with the situation by initiating several projects. The government built irrigation networks like DVC and Mayurakshi project, the Durgapur industrial zone and the Salt Lake City, but they failed to arrest West Bengal's decline. Poverty rose, and West Bengal lost its top place and lagged well behind other Indian states in industrial development. Massive political unrest, strikes and violence crippled the state for the three decades after Partition.

North East India 
Rail and road links connecting North East India to the rest of the country passed through East Bengal territory. The lines connecting Siliguri in North Bengal to Kolkata and Assam to Chittagong were severed. The whole Assam Railway was cut off from the rest of the Indian system. Those lines carried almost all freight traffic from those regions. The most important commodities were tea and timber. The tea industry in Assam depended on the Chittagong Port to export its produce and import raw materials for the industry such as coal, which was used as the fuel to dry the tea leaves. The industry was severely hit, as Chittagong went to Pakistan. Initially, India and Pakistan reached an agreement to allow cross-border transit traffic, but India now had to pay a tariff. By 1950, India had reconnected Assam to the rest of the country's rail network by building a 229 km meter gauge rail link through the Siliguri Corridor, but now the Tea chests from Assam's gardens would have to be carried over a much longer distance to reach the Port of Kolkata. Exporting tea via the nearby Chittagong port was still an option, but after the Indo-Pakistani War of 1965, all transit traffic was switched off by Pakistan.

East Pakistan became independent Bangladesh in 1971 but cross-border railway traffic did not resume until 2003. By the 1990s, India upgraded the Assam rail link to  broad gauge up to Dibrugarh, thereby easing the traffic problem in Brahmaputra Valley region, but the southern section of the area, which comprises Tripura, Mizoram, Manipur and Barak valley of Assam, still faces serious connectivity problems. Talks between both countries are underway to allow transit traffic between the area and Mainland India through Bangladesh.

East Bengal 

At Partition, East Bengal had no large industry. There were few mineral resources in this region. Its economy was completely agrarian. The main produce was food grains and other crops, jute, bamboo, leather and fish. The raw materials were consumed by factories in and around Kolkata. Kolkata was the centre of Bengal's economic and social development for both Hindus and Muslims. All large industries, military bases and government offices and most of the institutions of higher education were in Kolkata. Without Kolkata, East Bengal was decapitated. It lost its traditional market for agricultural products. It also lost Kolkata, the most important port of the country. East Bengal had to begin from nothing. Dhaka was then only a district headquarters. Government offices had to be placed inside makeshift buildings. Dhaka also faced a severe human resource crisis. The majority of high-ranking officers in British Indian administration were Hindu and migrated to West Bengal. Often, the posts had to be filled up by West Pakistani officers. Desperately poor, East Bengal soon became politically dominated by West Pakistan. Economic disparities and subjugation of Bengalis by the Punjabi elite eventually led to a struggle for separation in 1971.

In popular culture 

Chinnamul (The Uprooted) a 1950 Bengali film directed by   Nemai Ghosh, first dealt with the theme of partition of Bengal. This was followed by Ritwik Ghatak's trilogy, Meghe Dhaka Tara (Cloud-covered stars) (1960), Komal Gandhar (1961), and Subarnarekha (1962), all dealing with the aftermath of the partition.

The film Rajkahini directed by Srijit Mukherji is also based on the theme of partition of Bengal 1947.

See also 
 East Pakistan
 Greater Bengal
 The 1947 Partition Archive
 Bengali Hindu Homeland Movement

Notes

Bengali Hindus in Assam

References

Sources

 
 
 
 
 
 
 
 
 
 
 
 
 
 
 
 
 
 S. M. Ikram Indian Muslims and Partition of India. New Delhi: Atlantic Publishers and Distributors, 1992. 
 Hashim S. Raza Mountbatten and the partition of India. New Delhi: Atlantic Publishers and Distributors, 1989. 
 
 Gyanendra Pandey Remembering Partition: Violence, Nationalism, and History in India. Cambridge: Cambridge University Press, 2001. 
 Mookerjea-Leonard, Debali. (2017). Literature, Gender, and the Trauma of Partition: The Paradox of Independence London and New York: Routledge. 

20th century in Kolkata
History of Bengal
History of East Pakistan
Bengal
Partition (politics)
1947 in India